Surgical Outcomes Analysis & Research, SOAR, is a research laboratory of the Department of Surgery at Boston University School of Medicine and Boston Medical Center with expertise in outcomes research. SOAR investigates surgical diseases and perioperative outcomes.  The group focuses on pancreatic cancer, other gastrointestinal and hepatobiliary malignancies, vascular disease, and transplant surgery.  SOAR's goal is to examine quality, delivery, and financing of care in order to have an immediate impact on patient care and system improvements.  The group members utilize national health services and administrative databases, as well as institutional databases, to investigate and to address factors contributing to disease outcomes and healthcare disparities.

The work in SOAR incorporates advanced statistical techniques, including logistic regression, prediction score, and decision analysis modeling.

About Outcomes Research
Outcomes Research evaluates the impact of health care on the health outcomes of patients and populations. This research may also include the evaluation of economic impacts linked to health outcomes, such as cost effectiveness and cost utility. An emphasis is placed on disease-oriented evaluations of care delivered in general, real-world settings. There are a wide range of outcomes to study including mortality, morbidity, functional status, mental well-being, and other aspects of health-related quality of life. Outcomes research is a multidisciplinary field of inquiry that examines the use, quality, delivery, and financing of health care services to increase knowledge and understanding of the structure, processes, and effects of health services for individuals and populations. Outcomes research provides the data to help solve critical problems that are faced in everyday clinical practice. The information learned can have an immediate impact on patient care and system improvement.

About SOAR
SOAR was founded in 2007 at UMass Medical School and relocated to Beth Israel Deaconess Medical Center and Harvard Medical School, Boston, Massachusetts, in 2012.

The mission of SOAR is to decrease perioperative morbidity and mortality, address health care disparities, and increase overall patient survival and quality of life. SOAR members hope, as part of the surgical outcomes research community, to improve overall outcomes for patients with surgical diseases.

Research Goals
 Pancreatic cancer and pancreatic disease
 Other gastrointestinal and hepatobiliary malignancies
 Vascular disease
 Transplant surgery and transplant psychology
 Investigating factors that affect surgical outcomes for diverse specialties including colorectal, cardiovascular, transplant, plastic and reconstructive, and minimally invasive surgery

About Boston Medical Center
Boston Medical Center (BMC) in Boston, Massachusetts is a teaching hospital of Boston University School of Medicine. Situated in Boston's South End neighborhood, BMC is the largest safety-net hospital in New England and caters to a diverse patient population from around the world.

Ongoing Research
SOAR researchers use national health services and administrative databases as well as prospective institutional tissue-linked databases to investigate factors contributing to disease outcomes for pancreatic cancer, hepato biliary disease, vascular disease, colorectal disease, plastic and reconstructive surgery, and transplant medicine.  These projects are under development with the use of the following databases:
 AHRQ Nationwide Inpatient Sample (NIS)
 National Surgical Quality Improvement Program (NSQIP)
 Surveillance, Epidemiology, and End Results (SEER)
 SEER Medicare
 National Cancer Database

Additionally, individual research groups have access to and have expertise in disease- and specialty-specific databases. These include:
 Vascular Study Group of New England (VSGNE), a regional vascular surgery database.
 Vascular Quality Initiative (VQI), a national vascular surgery database. 
 American Society of Thoracic Surgery (ASTS) database
 National Trauma Data Bank (NTDB)
 Scientific Registry of Transplant Recipients

Also, SOAR researchers are conducting patient-centered outcomes research designed to:
 Measure health-related, functional, and other outcomes from the perspective of patients and their families
 Develop decision aid tools and strategies to assist patients in making complex choices about their healthcare
 Compare the effectiveness of surgical interventions on patient-reported outcomes

Personnel
 Jennifer F. Tseng, MD, MPH - SOAR Founder and Co-Director; Surgeon-in-Chief, Boston Medical Center; James Utley Professor and Chair of Surgery, Boston University School of Medicine
 James R. Rodrigue, PhD - SOAR Co-Director; Director, Behavioral Health Services and Research, The Transplant Center, Beth Israel Deaconess Medical Center; Professor, Psychiatry, Harvard Medical School
 Marc L. Schermerhorn, MD - SOAR Co-Director; Chief, Vascular and Endovascular Surgery, Beth Israel Deaconess Medical Center; Associate Professor, Harvard Medical School

Publications

Publications 2014 
 
 Bliss LA, Yang CJ, Chau Z, Ng SC, McFadden DW, Kent TS, Moser AJ, Callery MP, Tseng JF. "Patient selection and the volume effect in pancreatic surgery: unequal benefits? HPB (Oxford) 2014 Jun 6.
 
 
 
 
 
 
 
 
 Glazier AK, Heffernan K, Rodrigue JR. "A framework for conducting deceased donor research in the U.S."  Transplantation. In Press.
 
 
 
 
 
 
 
 
 
 
 
 Rodrigue JR, Leishman R, Vishnevsky T, Evenson AR, Mandelbrot DA. "Concerns of ABO incompatible and crossmatch-positive potential donors and recipients about participating in kidney exchanges." Clin Transplant. In Press.
 Rodrigue JR, Schold JD, Morrissey J, Whiting J, Vella J, Kayler L, Katz D, Jones J, Kaplan B, Fleishman A, Pavlakis M, Mandelbrot DA. "Pre-donation direct and indirect costs incurred by adults who donated a kidney: Findings from the KDOC study."  Am J Transplant. In Press.
 
 Schold JD, Buccini LB, Rodrigue JR, Mandelbrot D, Goldfarb DA, Flechner SM, Kayler LK, Poggio ED. "Critical factors associated with missing follow-up data for living kidney donors in the United States." Am J Transplant. In Press.
 Yang CJ, Bliss LA, Schapira EF, Freedman SD, Ng SC, Windsor JA, Tseng JF. "Systematic Review of Early Surgery for Chronic Pancreatitis: Impact on Pain, Pancreatic Function, and Re-intervention. J Gastrointest Surg. 2014 Jun 19.

Publications 2013 
 Arous, Edward J., et al. "Electronic medical record: research tool for pancreatic cancer?." Journal of Surgical Research (2013).
 
 Bensley, Rodney P., et al. "Accuracy of administrative data versus clinical data to evaluate carotid endarterectomy and carotid stenting." Journal of Vascular Surgery (2013).
 Bensley, Rodney P., et al. "Risk of late-onset adhesions and incisional hernia repairs after surgery." Journal of the American College of Surgeons (2013).
 Bensley, Rodney P., et al. "Open repair of intact thoracoabdominal aortic aneurysms in the American College of Surgeons National Surgical Quality Improvement Program." Journal of Vascular Surgery (2013).
 Buck Dominique B., et al. "Endovascular treatment of abdominal aortic aneurysms." National Review of Cardiology (2013).
 Chau, Zeling, et al. "Rankings versus reality in pancreatic cancer surgery: a real‐world comparison." HPB (2013).
 Edwards, Samuel T., et al. "Comparative effectiveness of endovascular versus open repair of ruptured abdominal aortic aneurysm in the Medicare population." Journal of Vascular Surgery (2013).
 Fokkema, M., et al. "Clinical Relevance of Cranial Nerve Injury following Carotid Endarterectomy." European Journal of Vascular and Endovascular Surgery (2013).
 Fokkema, Margriet, et al. "In-hospital vs postdischarge adverse events following carotid endarterectomy." Journal of Vascular Surgery (2013).
 Fokkema, Margriet, et al. "Selective external endarterectomy in patients with ipsilateral symptomatic internal carotid artery occlusion." Journal of Vascular Surgery (2013).
 
 Kalish, Brian T., et al. "Quality Assessment in Pancreatic Surgery: What Might Tomorrow Require?." Journal of Gastrointestinal Surgery' 17.1 (2013): 86-93.
 Khoynezhad A., et al. "Results of a multicenter, prospective trial of thoracic endovascular aortic repair for blunt thoracic aortic injury (RESCUE trial)." Journal of Vascular Surgery (2013).
 Lo, Ruby C., et al. "Gender differences in abdominal aortic aneurysm presentation, repair, and mortality in the Vascular Study Group of New England." Journal of Vascular Surgery (2013).
 Lo, Ruby C., et al. "Outcomes following infrapopliteal angioplasty for critical limb ischemia." Journal of Vascular Surgery (2013).
 Lo, Ruby C., et al. "Presentation, treatment, and outcome differences between men and women undergoing revascularization or amputation for lower extremity peripheral arterial disease." Journal of Vascular Surgery (2013).
 Lo Ruby C., et al. "Relative importance of aneurysm diameter and body size for predicting abdominal aortic aneurysm rupture in men and women." Journal of Vascular Surgery (2013).
 
 Ragulin‐Coyne, Elizaveta, et al. "National trends in pancreaticoduodenal trauma: interventions and outcomes." HPB (2013).
 
 
 
 Rodrigue, James R., et al. "Trajectories of Perceived Benefits in Living Kidney Donors: Association With Donor Characteristics and Recipient Outcomes." Transplantation (2013).
 
 Rodrigue, James R., Jesse D. Schold, and Didier A. Mandelbrot. "The Decline in Living Kidney Donation in the United States: Random Variation or Cause for Concern?." Transplantation (2013).
 Schermerhorn, Marc L., et al. "The impact of Centers for Medicare and Medicaid Services high-risk criteria on outcome after carotid endarterectomy and carotid artery stenting in the SVS Vascular Registry." Journal of Vascular Surgery (2013).
 
 Siracuse, Jeffrey J., et al. "Prosthetic graft infections involving the femoral artery." Journal of Vascular Surgery (2013).
Smith, Jillian K., et al. "Does increasing insurance improve outcomes for US cancer patients?." Journal of Surgical Research (2013).
 Yoshida, Shunsuke, et al. "The current national criteria for carotid artery stenting overestimate its efficacy in patients who are symptomatic and at high risk." Journal of Vascular Surgery (2013).

 Publications 2012 
 
 
 
 
 
 
 
 
 Ragulin-Coyne, Elizaveta, et al. "Perioperative mortality after pancreatectomy: a risk score to aid decision-making." Surgery (2012).
 
 
 
 
 Tseng, Jennifer F. "Proceed with Caution: Vascular Resection at Pancreaticoduodenectomy." Annals of Surgical Oncology (2012): 1-2.
 

 Publications 2011 

 
 

 

 
 
 
 

 
 
 

 Publications 2010 
 
 
 
 
 
 
 
 
 
 Manasanch EE, Smith JK, Bodnari A, McKinney J, Gray C, McDade TP, Tseng JF. "Tumor registry versus physician medical record review: A head-tohead comparison of pancreatic neuroendocrine tumor cases. In press, Journal of Oncology Practice. 
 
 
 
 Nath B, Li YF, Carroll JE, Szabo G, Tseng JF, Shah SA. "Alcohol exposure as a risk factor for adverse outcomes in elective surgery. J Gastrointest Surg. 210 Nov;14(11)1732-41.
 
 
 
 
 
 
 
 
 
 
 

 Publications 2009 
 Cooley EK, McPhee JT, Simons JP, Sweeney WB, Tseng JF, Alavi K. Colorectal neoplasia screening before age 50? "Current epidemiologic trends in the United States. Dis Colon Rectum 2009 Feb; 52(2):222-9.
 
 
 
 
 
 
 
 
 
 
 
 
 
 
 
 
 

 Publications 2008 

 Tseng JF, Fernández-del Castillo C, Warshaw AL. Survival after medical and surgical treatment of pancreatic adenocarcinoma.  In: Beger HG, Matsuno S, Cameron JL, eds. Diseases of the Pancreas:  Current Surgical Therapy. Heidelberg: Springer Inc, 2008;61:695-704

Publications 2007
 Hill JS, Shankar S, Evans DB, Tseng JF. "Control of bleeding from the portal/superior mesenteric vein.  Operative Techniques in General Surgery'' 2007 Dec;(9)4:152-159

 Tseng JF, Fernández-del Castillo C, Warshaw AL.  The cystic tumors of the pancreas. In: Blumgart LH, ed.  Surgery of the Liver, Biliary Tract and Pancreas.  Philadelphia: Elsevier Inc, 2007

See also
 Surgery
 Cardiac surgery
 Hypnosurgery
 Surgical sieve

External links
 Official SOAR site 
 Kidney Donor Outcomes Cohort (KDOC) Study

Harvard Medical School